All Saints School may refer to:

England
 All Saints Catholic School, Dagenham, a Roman Catholic secondary school in Dagenham, London, England 
 Bloxham School (also called All Saints' School), an independent boarding school in Oxfordshire, England

India
 All Saints School, Bhopal, an English medium school in Idgah Hills Bhopal, India

Malaysia
 All Saints Secondary School, Kota Kinabalu, a national single-session secondary school in Sabah, Malaysia
 All Saints National Primary School, Kamunting, a government-funded primary school in Perak, Malaysia

United States
 All Saints School (Sioux Falls, South Dakota), a historic private school listed on the National Register of Historic Places

See also
 All Saints High School (disambiguation)
 All Saints Academy (disambiguation)
 All Saints College (disambiguation)
 All Saints Episcopal School (disambiguation)
 All Saints University (disambiguation)